Dudley Street Guns Village is a tram stop in West Bromwich in the West Midlands, England. It was opened on 31 May 1999 and is situated on Midland Metro Line 1. It is the recommended interchange stop for buses to Great Bridge and Dudley (service 74).

Services
Mondays to Fridays, Midland Metro services in each direction between Birmingham and Wolverhampton run at six to eight-minute intervals during the day, and at fifteen-minute intervals during the evenings and on Sundays. They run at eight minute intervals on Saturdays.

References

External links

 Article on this Metro stop from Rail Around Birmingham & the West Midlands
 Article from thetrams.co.uk

West Midlands Metro stops
Transport in Sandwell
West Bromwich
Railway stations in Great Britain opened in 1999